|}

This is a list of House of Assembly results for the 1965 South Australian state election.

Results by electoral district

Adelaide

Albert

Alexandra

Angas

Barossa

Burnside

Burra

Chaffey

Edwardstown

Enfield

Eyre

Flinders

Frome

Gawler

Glenelg

Gouger

Gumeracha

Hindmarsh

Light

Millicent

Mitcham

Mount Gambier

Murray

Norwood

Onkaparinga

Port Adelaide

Port Pirie

Ridley

Rocky River

Semaphore

Stirling

Stuart

Torrens

Unley

Victoria

Wallaroo

West Torrens

Whyalla

Yorke Peninsula

See also
 Members of the South Australian House of Assembly, 1965–1968
 Candidates of the 1965 South Australian state election

References

1965
1965 elections in Australia
1960s in South Australia